Guindo is a surname. Notable people with the surname include:

Aboubacar Guindo (born 1981), Malian football player
Brahima Guindo (born 1977), Malian judoka
Daouda Guindo (born 2002), Malian footballer
Housseini Amion Guindo (born 1970), Malian politician
Modibo Tounty Guindo, Malian judge
Moussa Guindo (born 1991),  Ivorian-Malian football player